Jakarta Love Story is an Indonesian soap opera musical comedy drama produced by SinemArt that airs daily on RCTI. The cast includes Irish Bella, Rezky Aditya, Rionaldo Stockhorst, Mischa Chandrawinata, Michella Putri, Nasya Marcella, Keth Agustine, Christian Sugiono, Kenang Mirdad & Meistika Senichaksana.

Cast
 Irish Bella — Shinta
 Rezky Aditya — Aryo
 Rionaldo Stockhorst — Teguh
 Mischa Chandrawinata — Dino
 Michella Putri — Alyssa
 Nasya Marcella — Dira 
 Kenang Mirdad — Ucok
 Delano Daniel — Vito
 Ketrin Agustine — Cathy
 Mona Ratuliu — Shinta's wife
 Irwan Chandra — Jhony
 Roy Marten — Bandrio
 Eeng Saptahadi — Hendro
 Adipura — Jacob
 Debby Sahertian — Puspa
 Christian Sugiono — Angga
 Mezty Mez — Tiffany
 Yoelitta Palar — Tiara
 Shandy Ishabella — Vito's wife
 Ramdhani Qubil AJ — Dira's father
 Shelsie Valencia — Emely
 Elkie Kwee

Characters

References

External links 
 

2015 Indonesian television series debuts
Indonesian drama television series
Indonesian television soap operas
Indonesian comedy television series
Musical television soap operas
2010s Indonesian television series
2010s television soap operas